Qafthanë Church is a church in Urakë, Elbasan County, Albania. It became a Cultural Monument of Albania in 1948.

References

Cultural Monuments of Albania
Buildings and structures in Prrenjas